See Mount Olivet Cemetery for other cemeteries with this name.

Mount Olivet Cemetery is a Roman Catholic cemetery in Janesville, Wisconsin. It is located on the west side of the Rock River at 1827 North Washington Street. The cemetery is operated by the Roman Catholic Diocese of Madison Cemeteries.

History
Mount Olivet Cemetery was established in Janesville after the local cemetery located atop Courthouse Hill was moved to a new cemetery called Oak Hill at the northwest edge of the city. Catholic residents of the city, organized as the Mount Olivet Cemetery Association, established a cemetery on 40 acres adjacent to Oak Hill Cemetery. The Catholic cemetery was originally called St. Patrick's, after the local Catholic church, but when a second Catholic church was established, it was renamed Mount Olivet. Later, additional land was added to the cemetery. A small Romanesque Revival style chapel was added to the cemetery in 1901. It contains a replica of Michelangelo's Pietà.

In the early 1970s, the diocese incorporated the cemetery into the diocesan cemetery network. It serves the parishes of St. William, St. John Vianney, St. Patrick, and Nativity of Mary in Janesville.

Notable burials
John Morrissey, Major League Baseball
Tom Morrissey, Major League Baseball
Father George Strickner, Catholic missionary
Joseph Reilly, World War II veteran, Band of Brothers

References

External links
Mount Olivet Cemetery

Cemeteries in Wisconsin
Roman Catholic cemeteries in Wisconsin
Janesville, Wisconsin